

Events

Pre-1600
1249 – Andrew of Longjumeau is dispatched by Louis IX of France as his ambassador to meet with the Khagan of the Mongol Empire.
1270 – Grand Duchy of Lithuania defeats the Livonian Order in the Battle of Karuse.

1601–1900
1630 – Dutch forces led by Hendrick Lonck capture Olinda in what was to become part of Dutch Brazil.
1646 – Battle of Torrington, Devon: The last major battle of the First English Civil War.
1699 – First Leopoldine Diploma is issued by the Holy Roman Emperor, recognizing the Greek Catholic clergy enjoyed the same privileges as Roman Catholic priests in the Principality of Transylvania.
1742 – Spencer Compton, Earl of Wilmington, becomes British Prime Minister.
1796 – Colombo in Ceylon (now Sri Lanka) falls to the British, completing their invasion of Ceylon.
1804 – First Barbary War: Stephen Decatur leads a raid to burn the pirate-held frigate .
1862 – American Civil War: General Ulysses S. Grant captures Fort Donelson, Tennessee.
1866 – Spencer Compton Cavendish, Marquess of Hartington becomes British Secretary of State for War.
1881 – The Canadian Pacific Railway is incorporated by Act of Parliament at Ottawa (44th Vic., c.1).
1899 – Iceland's first football club, Knattspyrnufélag Reykjavíkur, is founded.
1900 – The Southern Cross expedition led by Carsten Borchgrevink achieved a new Farthest South of 78° 50'S, making the first landing at the Great Ice Barrier.

1901–present
1918 – The Council of Lithuania unanimously adopts the Act of Independence, declaring Lithuania an independent state.
1923 – Howard Carter unseals the burial chamber of Pharaoh Tutankhamun.
1930 – The Romanian Football Federation joins FIFA.
1934 – The Austrian Civil War ends with the defeat of the Social Democrats and the Republikanischer Schutzbund.
1936 – The Popular Front wins the 1936 Spanish general election.
1937 – Wallace H. Carothers receives a United States patent for nylon.
1940 – World War II: Altmark incident: The German tanker Altmark is boarded by sailors from the British destroyer . A total of 299 British prisoners are freed.
1942 – World War II: In Athens, the Greek People's Liberation Army is established
  1942   – World War II: Attack on Aruba, first World War II German shots fired on a land based object in the Americas.
1943 – World War II: In the early phases of the Third Battle of Kharkov, Red Army troops re-enter the city.
1945 – World War II: American forces land on Corregidor Island in the Philippines.
  1945   – The Alaska Equal Rights Act of 1945, the first anti-discrimination law in the United States, was signed into law.
1959 – Fidel Castro becomes Premier of Cuba after dictator Fulgencio Batista was overthrown on January 1.
1960 – The U.S. Navy submarine  begins Operation Sandblast, setting sail from New London, Connecticut, to begin the first submerged circumnavigation of the globe.
1961 – Explorer program: Explorer 9 (S-56a) is launched.
1962 – The Great Sheffield Gale impacts the United Kingdom, killing nine people; the city of Sheffield is devastated, with 150,000 homes damaged.
  1962   – Flooding in the coastal areas of West Germany kills 315 and destroys the homes of about 60,000 people.
1968 – In Haleyville, Alabama, the first 9-1-1 emergency telephone system goes into service.
  1968   – Civil Air Transport Flight 010 crashes near Shongshan Airport in Taiwan, killing 21 of the 63 people on board and one more on the ground.
1978 – The first computer bulletin board system is created (CBBS in Chicago).
1983 – The Ash Wednesday bushfires in Victoria and South Australia kill 75.
1985 – Hezbollah is founded.
1986 – The Soviet liner  runs aground in the Marlborough Sounds, New Zealand.
  1986   – China Airlines Flight 2265 crashes into the Pacific Ocean near Penghu Airport in Taiwan, killing all 13 aboard.
1991 – Nicaraguan Contras leader Enrique Bermúdez is assassinated in Managua.
1996 – A Chicago-bound Amtrak train, the Capitol Limited, collides with a MARC commuter train bound for Washington, D.C., killing 11 people.
1998 – China Airlines Flight 676 crashes into a road and residential area near Chiang Kai-shek International Airport in Taiwan, killing all 196 aboard and seven more on the ground.
2000 – Emery Worldwide Airlines Flight 17 crashes near Sacramento Mather Airport in Rancho Cordova, California, killing all three aboard.
2005 – The Kyoto Protocol comes into force, following its ratification by Russia.
  2005   – The National Hockey League cancels the entire 2004–05 regular season and playoffs.
2006 – The last Mobile army surgical hospital (MASH) is decommissioned by the United States Army.
2013 – A bomb blast at a market in Hazara Town, Quetta, Pakistan kills more than 80 people and injures 190 others.
2021 – Five thousand people gathered in the town of Kherrata, Bejaia Province to mark the two year anniversary of the Hirak protest movement. Demonstrations had been suspended because of the COVID-19 pandemic in Algeria.

Births

Pre-1600
1222 – Nichiren, founder of Nichiren Buddhism (d. 1282)
1304 – Jayaatu Khan Tugh Temür, Chinese emperor (d. 1332)
1331 – Coluccio Salutati, Italian political leader (d. 1406)
1419 – John I, Duke of Cleves (d. 1481)
1470 – Eric I, Duke of Brunswick-Lüneburg (d. 1540)
1471 – Krishnadevaraya, emperor of the Vijayanagara Empire (d. 1529)
1497 – Philip Melanchthon, German astronomer, theologian, and academic (d. 1560)
1514 – Georg Joachim Rheticus, Austrian cartographer and instrument maker (d. 1574)
1519 – Gaspard II de Coligny, French admiral (d. 1572)
1543 – Kanō Eitoku, Japanese painter and educator (d. 1590)

1601–1900
1620 – Frederick William, Elector of Brandenburg (d. 1688)
1643 – John Sharp, English archbishop (d. 1714)
1698 – Pierre Bouguer, French mathematician, geophysicist, and astronomer (d. 1758)
1727 – Nikolaus Joseph von Jacquin, Austrian botanist, chemist, and mycologist (d. 1817)
1740 – Giambattista Bodoni, Italian publisher and engraver (d. 1813)
1761 – Jean-Charles Pichegru, French general (d. 1804)
1774 – Pierre Rode, French violinist and composer (d. 1830)
1786 – Maria Pavlovna, Russian Grand Duchess (d. 1859)
1802 – Phineas Quimby, American mystic and philosopher (d. 1866)
1804 – Karl Theodor Ernst von Siebold, German physiologist and zoologist (d. 1885)
1812 – Henry Wilson, American colonel and politician, 18th Vice President of the United States (d. 1875)
1821 – Heinrich Barth, German explorer and scholar (d. 1865)
1822 – Francis Galton, English biologist and statistician (d. 1911)
1824 – Peter Kosler, Slovenian lawyer, geographer, and cartographer (d. 1879)
1826 – Joseph Victor von Scheffel, German poet and author (d. 1886)
1830 – Lars Hertervig, Norwegian painter (d. 1902)
1831 – Nikolai Leskov, Russian author, playwright, and journalist (d. 1895)
1834 – Ernst Haeckel, German biologist, physician, and philosopher (d. 1919)
1838 – Henry Adams, American journalist, historian, and author (d. 1918)
1841 – Armand Guillaumin, French painter (d. 1927)
1843 – Henry M. Leland, American engineer and businessman, founded Cadillac and Lincoln (d. 1932)
1845 – George Kennan, American journalist and explorer (d. 1924)
1848 – Hugo de Vries, Dutch botanist, geneticist, and academic (d. 1935)
  1848   – Octave Mirbeau, French journalist, novelist, and playwright (d. 1917)
1856 – Ossian Everett Mills, American academic, founded Phi Mu Alpha Sinfonia (d. 1920)
1866 – Billy Hamilton, American baseball player and manager (d. 1940)
1868 – Edward S. Curtis, American ethnologist and photographer (d. 1952)
1873 – Radoje Domanović, Serbian journalist and author (d. 1908)
1876 – G. M. Trevelyan, English historian and academic (d. 1962)
1877 – Tom Crean, Irish seaman and Antarctic explorer (d. 1938) 
1878 – Pamela Colman Smith, English occultist and illustrator (d. 1951)
  1878   – James Colosimo, Italian-American mob boss (d. 1920)
1884 – Robert J. Flaherty, American director and producer (d. 1951)
1886 – Andy Ducat, English international footballer, manager and cricketer (d. 1942)
1887 – Kathleen Clifford, American actress (d. 1962)
1891 – Hans F. K. Günther, German eugenicist and academic (d. 1968)
1893 – Katharine Cornell, American actress and producer (d. 1974)
1896 – Eugénie Blanchard, French super-centenarian (d. 2010)

1901–present
1901 – Wayne King, American singer-songwriter and conductor (d. 1985)
  1901   – Chester Morris, American actor (d. 1970)
1902 – Cyril Vincent, South African cricketer (d. 1968)
1903 – Edgar Bergen, American ventriloquist and actor (d. 1978)
1904 – James Baskett, African-American actor and singer (d. 1948)
  1904   – George F. Kennan, American historian and diplomat, United States Ambassador to the Soviet Union (d. 2005)
1905 – Henrietta Barnett, British Women's Royal Air Force officer (d. 1985)
1906 – Vera Menchik, British-Czechoslovak-Russian chess player (d. 1944)
1909 – Hugh Beaumont, American actor and director (d. 1982)
  1909   – Richard McDonald, American businessman, co-founded McDonald's (d. 1998)
1914 – Jimmy Wakely, American country music singer-songwriter and actor (d. 1982)
1916 – Bill Doggett, African-American pianist and composer (d. 1996)
1919 – Georges Ulmer, Danish-French actor and composer (d. 1989)
1920 – Anna Mae Hays, American general (d. 2018)
1921 – Vera-Ellen, German-American actress, singer, and dancer (d. 1981)
  1921   – Jean Behra, French race car driver (d. 1959)
  1921   – John Galbraith Graham, English priest and academic (d. 2013)
1922 – Heinz-Wolfgang Schnaufer, German soldier and pilot (d. 1950)
1923 – Samuel Willenberg, Polish-Israeli sculptor and painter (d. 2016)
1926 – Margot Frank, German-Dutch holocaust victim (d. 1945)
  1926   – John Schlesinger, English actor and director (d. 2003)
1927 – June Brown, English actress (d. 2022)
1929 – Gerhard Hanappi, Austrian footballer and architect (d. 1980)
  1929   – Peter Porter, Australian-English poet and educator (d. 2010)
1931 – Otis Blackwell, American singer-songwriter and pianist (d. 2002)
  1931   – Ken Takakura, Japanese actor and singer (d. 2014)
1932 – Ahmad Tejan Kabbah, Sierra Leonean economist, lawyer, and politician, 3rd President of Sierra Leone (d. 2014)
  1932   – Gretchen Wyler, American actress, singer, and dancer (d. 2007)
1934 – August Coppola, American author and academic (d. 2009)
  1934   – Marlene Hagge, American golfer
1935 – Brian Bedford, English-American actor and director (d. 2016)
  1935   – Sonny Bono, American actor, singer, and politician  (d. 1998)
  1935   – Stephen Gaskin, American activist, co-founded The Farm (d. 2014)
  1935   – Bradford Parkinson, American colonel and engineer
  1935   – Kenneth Price, American painter and sculptor (d. 2012)
1937 – Paul Bailey, British novelist, critic, and biographer
  1937   – Valentin Bondarenko, Soviet aviator and cosmonaut (d. 1961)
  1937   – Yuri Manin, Russian-German mathematician and academic (d. 2023)
1938 – John Corigliano, American composer and academic
1939 – Adolfo Azcuna, Filipino lawyer and judge
1940 – Hannelore Schmatz, German mountaineer (d. 1979)
1941 – Kim Jong-il, North Korean commander and politician, 2nd Supreme Leader of North Korea (d. 2011)
1942 – Richard Williams, American tennis player and coach
1944 – Glyn Davies, Welsh farmer and politician
  1944   – Richard Ford, American novelist and short story writer
  1944   – António Mascarenhas Monteiro, Cape Verdean politician, 2nd President of Cape Verde (d. 2016)
1947 – Jaroslav Kubera, Czech politician (d. 2020)
1948 – Kaiketsu Masateru, Japanese sumo wrestler and coach (d. 2014)
1949 – Bob O'Reilly, Australian rugby league player
1950 – Peter Hain, Welsh politician, Secretary of State for Wales
1951 – Barry Foote, American baseball player and coach
1952 – Peter Kitchen, English footballer
  1952   – James Ingram, American singer-songwriter and producer (d. 2019)
1953 – John Bradbury, English drummer, songwriter, and producer (d. 2015)
  1953   – Lanny McDonald, Canadian ice hockey player and manager
  1953   – Roberta Williams, American video game designer, co-founded Sierra Entertainment
1954 – Iain Banks, Scottish author and playwright (d. 2013)
  1954   – Margaux Hemingway, American model and actress (d. 1996)
  1954   – Michael Holding, Jamaican cricketer and sportscaster
1956 – Vincent Ward, New Zealand director and screenwriter
1957 – LeVar Burton, actor, director, and producer
1958 – Natalie Angier, American author 
  1958   – Ice-T, American rapper and actor
  1958   – Oscar Schmidt, Brazilian basketball player
  1958   – Herb Williams, American basketball player and coach
1959 – John McEnroe, American tennis player and sportscaster
  1959   – Kelly Tripucka, American basketball player and sportscaster
1960 – Pete Willis, English guitarist and songwriter 
1961 – Des Hasler, Australian rugby league player and coach
  1961   – Liu Kang, Chinese footballer and manager (d. 2013)
  1961   – Niko Nirvi, Finnish journalist
  1961   – Andy Taylor, English singer-songwriter, guitarist, and producer 
1962 – John Balance, English singer-songwriter (d. 2004)
1964 – Bebeto, Brazilian footballer and manager
  1964   – Christopher Eccleston, English actor
1965 – Dave Lombardo, Cuban-American drummer
1967 – Keith Gretzky, Canadian ice hockey player and coach
1968 – Warren Ellis, English author and screenwriter
1970 – Angelo Peruzzi, Italian footballer and manager  
1971 – Michael Avenatti, American attorney and pundit
  1971   – Craig Laundy, Australian politician
1972 – Jerome Bettis, American football player
  1972   – Zoran Čampara, Bosnian football player
  1972   – Sarah Clarke, American actress
  1972   – Naomi Nishida, Japanese actress
  1972   – Darrell Trindall, Australian rugby league player
1973 – Cathy Freeman, Australian sprinter
1974 – Mahershala Ali, American actor
  1974   – José Dominguez, Portuguese international footballer and manager
1976 – Eric Byrnes, American baseball player and sportscaster
  1976   – Kyo, Japanese singer-songwriter and producer
1977 – Ian Clarke, Irish-American computer scientist, founded Freenet
  1977   – Ahman Green, American football player
1978 – Tia Hellebaut, Belgian high jumper and chemist
  1978   – Wasim Jaffer, Indian cricketer
  1978   – John Tartaglia, American actor, singer, and puppeteer
1979 – Stéphane Dalmat, French footballer
  1979   – Eric Mun, American-South Korean singer and actor 
  1979   – Valentino Rossi, Italian motorcycle racer
1980 – Longineu W. Parsons III, French-American drummer 
1981 – Jay Howard, English race car driver
  1981   – Susanna Kallur, Swedish sprint hurdler
  1981   – Jerry Owens, American baseball player
  1981   – Qyntel Woods, American basketball player
1982 – Aleksandr Dmitrijev, Estonian footballer
  1982   – Rickie Lambert, English footballer
  1982   – Lupe Fiasco, American rapper
1983 – Agyness Deyn, English model, actress, and singer
1984 – Sofia Arvidsson, Swedish tennis player
  1984   – Oussama Mellouli, Tunisian swimmer
1985 – Simon Francis, English footballer
  1985   – Stacy Lewis, American golfer
  1985   – Ron Vlaar, Dutch footballer
1986 – Diego Godín, Uruguayan footballer 
1987 – Luc Bourdon, Canadian ice hockey player (d. 2008)
  1987   – Theresa Goh, Singaporean swimmer
  1987   – Jon Ossoff, American politician and filmmaker
  1987   – Hasheem Thabeet, Tanzanian basketball player
1988 – Diego Capel, Spanish footballer
  1988   – Zhang Jike, Chinese table tennis player
  1988   – Denílson Pereira Neves, Brazilian footballer
  1988   – Andrea Ranocchia, Italian footballer
  1988   – Kim Soo-hyun, South Korean actor and singer
1989 – Elizabeth Olsen, American actress 
1990 – Dunamis Lui, Australian-Samoan rugby league player
  1990   – The Weeknd, Canadian singer-songwriter and producer
1991 – Sergio Canales, Spanish footballer
1992 – Nicolai Boilesen, Danish footballer
  1992   – Zsófia Susányi, Hungarian tennis player
1994 – Annika Beck, German tennis player
  1994   – Federico Bernardeschi, Italian footballer
  1994   – Ava Max, American singer and songwriter
1995 – Katy Dunne, English tennis player
  1995   – Carina Witthöft, German tennis player
1999 – Marie Ulven Ringheim, Norwegian singer, songwriter and music producer
2000 – Koffee, Jamaican reggae singer, songwriter and rapper
2001 – Yuki Naito, Japanese tennis player

Deaths

Pre-1600
 549 – Zhu Yi, Chinese general (b. 483)
 902 – Mary the Younger, Byzantine saint (b. 875)
1184 – Richard of Dover, Archbishop of Canterbury
1247 – Henry Raspe, Landgrave of Thuringia (b. 1204)
1279 – Afonso III of Portugal (b. 1210)
1281 – Gertrude of Hohenberg, queen consort of Germany (b. c.1225)
1390 – Rupert I, Elector Palatine (b. 1309)
1391 – John V Palaiologos, Byzantine emperor (b. 1332)
1531 – Johannes Stöffler, German mathematician and astronomer (b. 1452)
1560 – Jean du Bellay, French cardinal and diplomat (b. 1493)
1579 – Gonzalo Jiménez de Quesada, Spanish explorer (b. 1509)

1601–1900
1645 – Gonzalo Fernández de Córdoba, Spanish general and politician, 24th Governor of the Duchy of Milan (b. 1585)
1710 – Esprit Fléchier, French bishop and author (b. 1632)
1721 – James Craggs the Younger, English politician, Secretary of State for the Southern Department (b. 1686)
1754 – Richard Mead, English physician (b. 1673)
1820 – Georg Carl von Döbeln, Swedish general (b. 1758)
1862 – William Pennington American lawyer and politician, 13th Governor of New Jersey, 23rd Speaker of the United States House of Representatives (b. 1796)
1898 – Thomas Bracken, Irish-New Zealand journalist, poet, and politician (b. 1843)
1899 – Félix Faure, French merchant and politician, 7th President of France (b. 1841)

1901–present
1907 – Giosuè Carducci, Italian poet and educator, Nobel Prize laureate (b. 1835)
1912 – Nicholas of Japan, Russian-Japanese monk and saint (b. 1836)
1917 – Octave Mirbeau, French journalist, novelist, and playwright (b. 1848)
1919 – Vera Kholodnaya, Ukrainian actress (b. 1893)
1928 – Eddie Foy Sr., American actor and dancer (b. 1856)
1932 – Ferdinand Buisson, French academic and politician, Nobel Prize laureate (b. 1841)
  1932   – Edgar Speyer, American-English financier and philanthropist (b. 1862)
1944 – Dadasaheb Phalke, Indian director, producer, and screenwriter (b. 1870)
1957 – Josef Hofmann, Polish-American pianist and composer (b. 1876)
1961 – Dazzy Vance, American baseball player (b. 1891)
1964 – James M. Canty, American educator, school administrator, and businessperson (b. 1865)
1967 – Smiley Burnette, American singer-songwriter and actor (b. 1911)
1974 – John Garand, Canadian-American engineer, designed the M1 Garand Rifle (b. 1888)
1975 – Morgan Taylor, American hurdler and coach (b. 1903)
1977 – Janani Luwum, bishop, Church of Uganda, martyr (b. c.1922)
  1977   – Rózsa Péter, Hungarian mathematician (b. 1905)
1980 – Erich Hückel, German physicist and chemist (b. 1895)
1984 – M. A. G. Osmani, Bangladeshi general (b. 1918)
1990 – Keith Haring, American painter and activist (b. 1958)
1991 – Enrique Bermúdez, Nicaraguan lieutenant and engineer (b. 1932)
1992 – Angela Carter, English novelist, short story writer (b. 1940)
  1992   – Jânio Quadros, Brazilian politician, 22nd President of Brazil (b. 1917)
  1992   – Herman Wold, Norwegian-Swedish economist and statistician (b. 1908)
1996 – Roberto Aizenberg, Argentinian painter and sculptor (b. 1922)
  1996   – Roger Bowen, American actor and author (b. 1932)
  1996   – Pat Brown, American lawyer and politician, 32nd Governor of California (b. 1905)
  1996   – Brownie McGhee, American singer-songwriter and guitarist (b. 1915)
1997 – Chien-Shiung Wu, Chinese-American physicist and academic (b. 1912)
1998 – Mary Amdur, American toxicologist and public health researcher (b. 1908)
  1998   – Sheu Yuan-dong, Taiwanese politician (b. 1927)
2000 – Marceline Day, American actress (b. 1908)
  2000   – Lila Kedrova, Russian-French actress and singer
  2000   – Karsten Solheim, Norwegian-American businessman, founded PING (b. 1911)
2001 – Howard W. Koch, American director and producer (b. 1916)
  2001   – William Masters, American gynecologist and sexologist (b. 1915)
2002 – Walter Winterbottom, English footballer and manager (b. 1913)
2003 – Rusty Magee, American actor and composer (b. 1955)
2004 – Doris Troy, American singer-songwriter (b. 1937)
2006 – Johnny Grunge, American wrestler (b. 1966)
  2006   – Ernie Stautner, German-American football player and coach (b. 1925)
2009 – Stephen Kim Sou-hwan, South Korean cardinal (b. 1921)
2011 – Len Lesser, American actor (b. 1922)
  2011   – Justinas Marcinkevičius, Lithuanian poet and playwright (b. 1930)
2012 – Gary Carter, American baseball player and coach (b. 1954)
  2012   – Elyse Knox, American model, actress, and fashion designer (b. 1917)
  2012   – John Macionis, American swimmer and lieutenant (b. 1916)
  2012   – Anthony Shadid, American journalist (b. 1968)
2013 – Colin Edwards, Guyanese footballer (b. 1991)
  2013   – Grigory Pomerants, Russian philosopher and author (b. 1918)
  2013   – Tony Sheridan, English singer-songwriter and guitarist (b. 1940)
2014 – Ken Farragut, American football player (b. 1928)
  2014   – Kralle Krawinkel, German guitarist (b. 1947)
  2014   – Michael Shea, American author (b. 1946)
2015 – Lasse Braun, Algerian-Italian director, producer, and screenwriter (b. 1936)
  2015   – Lesley Gore, American singer-songwriter (b. 1946)
  2015   – R. R. Patil, Indian lawyer and politician, Deputy Chief Minister of Maharashtra (b. 1957)
  2015   – Lorena Rojas, Mexican actress and singer (b. 1971)
2016 – Boutros Boutros-Ghali, Egyptian politician and diplomat, 6th Secretary-General of the United Nations (b. 1922)
2019 – Bruno Ganz, Swiss actor (b. 1941)
2021 – Gustavo Noboa, Ecuadorian politician, 42nd President of Ecuador (b. 1937)

Holidays and observances
Christian feast day:
Abda of Edessa
Elias and companions
Juliana of Nicomedia (Catholic Church)
Onesimus
Charles Todd Quintard (Episcopal Church (USA))
February 16 (Eastern Orthodox liturgics)
Day of the Shining Star (Kim Jong-il's Birthday) (North Korea)
Restoration of Lithuania's Statehood Day, celebrate the independence of Lithuania from Russia and Germany in 1918 (Lithuania)
 Elizabeth Peratrovich Day (Alaska)

References

External links

 BBC: On This Day
 
 Historical Events on February 16

Days of the year
February